The Roman Catholic Diocese of Masaka is a diocese located in the city of Masaka in the Ecclesiastical province of Kampala in Uganda.

History
 May 25, 1939: Established as Apostolic Vicariate of Masaka from the Apostolic Vicariate of Uganda
 March 25, 1953: Promoted as Diocese of Masaka

Bishops
 Vicar Apostolic of Masaka (Roman rite) 
 Bishop Joseph Kiwánuka, M. Afr. R.I.P. (1939.05.25 – 1953.03.25 see below)
 Bishops of Masaka (Roman rite)
 Bishop Joseph Kiwánuka, M. Afr. R.I.P. (see above 1953.03.25 – 1960.12.20), appointed Archbishop of Rubaga
 Bishop Adrian Kivumbi Ddungu R.I.P. (1961.11.11 – 1998.01.10)
 Bishop John Baptist Kaggwa R.I.P. (1998.01.10 - 2019.04.16)
 Bishop Serverus Jjumba (Episcopal ordination on 6 July 2019) Former appointments: Bukalasa Seminary, Diocesan Treasury, Vicar General and finally elected Bishop of Masaka Diocese and pronounced publicly by the Holy See on 16 April 2019 at 2pm (EAT).

Edited by Joseph Kasekende and Morris Kayanja, Theologians at National Seminary Ggaba-Uganda.

Coadjutor Bishop
John Baptist Kaggwa (1994-1998)

Auxiliary Bishop
Henry Apaloryamam Ssentongo (1988-1992), appointed Bishop of Moroto

Other priest of this diocese who became bishop
Emmanuel Wamala, appointed Bishop of Kiyinda-Mityana in 1981; future Cardinal

See also
Roman Catholicism in Uganda
Masaka

References

Sources
catholic-hierarchy

External links
 GCatholic.org
 Catholic Hierarchy

Roman Catholic dioceses in Uganda
Christian organizations established in 1939
Roman Catholic dioceses and prelatures established in the 20th century
Masaka District
1939 establishments in Uganda
Roman Catholic Ecclesiastical Province of Kampala